The 1902 Calgary municipal election took place on December 8, 1902 to elect a Mayor and nine Aldermen to sit on the nineteenth Calgary City Council from January 5, 1903 to January 5, 1904.

Background
The position for Mayor was contested by incumbent one-term mayor Thomas Underwood, who also previously served seven terms as Alderman, and five-term Alderman William Mahon Parslow.

The election was held under multiple non-transferable vote where each elector was able to cast a ballot for the mayor and up to three ballots for separate councillors with a voter's designated ward.

Key issues in the election were expansion of the sewer system, public health related to the spread of scarlet fever, municipally owned electric light systems, prohibition, and expanded fire protection.

Richard Addison Brocklebank became the first labour supported candidate to sit on Calgary City Council after he was acclaimed in Ward 3.

Results

Mayor

Councillors

Ward 1

Ward 2

Ward 3
William Charles Gordon Armstrong - Acclaimed
Richard Addison Brocklebank - Acclaimed
James Abel Hornby - Acclaimed

School Trustees

September 1902 by-election
Following William Carson's decision to decline the office of Alderman for Ward 2 communicated to the City Clerk on December 18, 1902, a by-election was held which was won by William Henry Cushing.

See also
List of Calgary municipal elections

References

Sources
Frederick Hunter: THE MAYORS AND COUNCILS  OF  THE CORPORATION OF CALGARY Archived March 3, 2020

Politics of Calgary
Municipal elections in Calgary
1902 elections in Canada
1900s in Calgary